Miguel René Ortega Rodríguez (born 13 April 1995) is a Mexican professional footballer who plays as a goalkeeper for Liga MX club Tigres UANL.

Career statistics

Club

Honours
Tigres UANL
Liga MX: Apertura 2017, Clausura 2019
Campeón de Campeones: 2018
Campeones Cup: 2018
CONCACAF Champions League: 2020

References

External links
 
 
 

Living people
2000 births
Association football goalkeepers
Tigres UANL footballers
Liga MX players
Footballers from Puebla
Sportspeople from Puebla
Mexican footballers